Black Bull may refer to
The British 11th Armoured Division
Western Cattle in Storm, a $1 postage stamp in the Trans-Mississippi Issue set
Black Bull, an comics imprint of Wizard Entertainment
The Black Bull of Clarence, one of the ten heraldic Queen's Beasts
Blackbull, Queensland, a locality in Australia
Black Bull of Norroway, a Scottish fairy tale
Black Bull (Scotch whisky)
Black Bull railway station
The Black Bull (film), a 1959 Mexican film
 "Black Bull" (song), a 2019 song by Foals

See also
 Black cow (disambiguation)